Osteel is a municipality in the district of Aurich, in Lower Saxony, Germany.

History
The village was first mentioned in 1164. The early settlement was on the edge of a moor.

The arms of the municipality shows a golden crown at the top on a blue background. In the centre is a golden hammer. Left and right of each is a golden trifoliate clover. The clovers point to the agricultural sector.

Attractions
A landmark of the village is Warnfried Church, dated to the 12th century. The church has a length of 63 meters and is dedicated to Saint Werenfried. The Organ of the Church is the second oldest in Ostfriesland. It was built in 1619 by Master Edo Evers.

Outside the church stands a monument to the astronomers David and Johannes Fabricius. David first documented several stars and drew one of the first maps of East Frisia. His son Johannes first discovered sunspots with the aid of a telescope.

Transport
The main town is on the Osteel Bundesstraße 72 about six miles south of the old town. Railway lines connect it to Emden. After the closure of the station in 1978, the next station is now in three km south at Marienhafe.

Notable people 
 David Fabricius (1564–1617), astronomer
 Johannes Fabricius (1587–1617), astronomer
 Friedrich Vissering (1826–1885), Reichstagsabgeordneter
 Dirk Agena, (1889–1934), Politician and Reichstagsabgeordneter
 Siemen Rühaak (1950-), actor

References

External links

Towns and villages in East Frisia
Aurich (district)